Ted or Teddy Howard may refer to:

 Ted Howard (author) (born 1950), US social entrepreneur and author
 Ted Howard (conservationist), New Zealand conservationist and local politician
 Ted Howard (politician) (1868–1939), New Zealand politician
 Ted Howard (soccer) (born 1946), general secretary for CONCACAF, the governing football body in the Caribbean and North and Central America
Teddy Howard, character in Gothika

See also
Edward Howard (disambiguation)